Austria participated in the Eurovision Song Contest 2019 with the song "Limits" written and performed by Pænda. On 29 January 2019, the Austrian broadcaster  (ORF) announced that they had internally selected Pænda to compete at the 2019 contest in Tel Aviv, Israel, while "Limits" was presented to the public on 8 March 2019.

Austria was drawn to compete in the second semi-final of the Eurovision Song Contest which took place on 16 May 2019. Performing during the show in position 9, "Limits" was not announced among the top 10 entries of the second semi-final and therefore did not qualify to compete in the final. It was later revealed that Austria placed seventeenth out of the 18 participating countries in the semi-final with 21 points.

Background

The Austrian national broadcaster,  (ORF), broadcasts the event within Austria and organises the selection process for the nation's entry. ORF confirmed their intentions to participate at the 2019 Eurovision Song Contest on 21 September 2018. In  and since , ORF has held an internal selection to choose the artist and song to represent Austria at the contest.

Before Eurovision

Internal selection 
Up to 12 artists, including singers Hyäne Fischer, Joe Traxler and Sara De Blue, were nominated by the ORF Eurovision Song Contest Team led by ORF chief editor Stefan Zechner, which collaborated with music expert Eberhard Forcher who worked on the selection of the Austrian entries since 2016, to submit songs to the broadcaster. On 14 January 2019, Forcher revealed that three entries had been shortlisted with a final decision to be made within the week. On 29 January 2019, "Limits" written and performed by Pænda was announced by ORF as the Austrian entry for the Eurovision Song Contest 2019. Pænda was selected from the three shortlisted artists by Forcher, the ORF Eurovision Team and a panel of around 15 to 20 music industry and Eurovision experts, but was requested to submit a new song from her forthcoming unreleased album Evolution II due to the one initially submitted being deemed unconvincing enough. The presentation of the song took place on 8 March 2019 at an ORF press conference as well as during the radio show , aired on Hitradio Ö3.

Promotion
Pænda made several appearances across Europe to specifically promote "Limits" as the Austrian Eurovision entry. On 6 April, Pænda performed during the Eurovision in Concert event which was held at the AFAS Live venue in Amsterdam, Netherlands and hosted by Cornald Maas and Marlayne. On 14 April, Pænda performed during the London Eurovision Party, which was held at the Café de Paris venue in London, United Kingdom and hosted by Nicki French and Paddy O’Connell.

At Eurovision
According to Eurovision rules, all nations with the exceptions of the host country and the "Big Five" (France, Germany, Italy, Spain and the United Kingdom) are required to qualify from one of two semi-finals in order to compete for the final; the top ten countries from each semi-final progress to the final. The European Broadcasting Union (EBU) split up the competing countries into six different pots based on voting patterns from previous contests, with countries with favourable voting histories put into the same pot. On 28 January 2019, a special allocation draw was held which placed each country into one of the two semi-finals, as well as which half of the show they would perform in. Georgia was placed into the first semi-final, to be held on 14 May 2019, and was scheduled to perform in the second half of the show.

Once all the competing songs for the 2019 contest had been released, the running order for the semi-finals was decided by the shows' producers rather than through another draw, so that similar songs were not placed next to each other. Austria was set to perform in position 9, following the entry from Sweden and before the entry from Croatia.

The two semi-finals and the final were broadcast in Austria on ORF 1 with commentary by Andi Knoll. The Austrian spokesperson, who announced the top 12-point score awarded by the Austrian jury during the final, was Philipp Hansa.

Semi-final

Pænda took part in technical rehearsals on 6 and 10 May, followed by dress rehearsals on 13 and 14 May. This included the jury show on 13 May where the professional juries of each country watched and voted on the competing entries.

The Austrian performance featured Pænda sitting on a stool and performing on a black and white stage, with explosions of lights throughout the performance from thin light poles surrounding Pænda that create patterns and from the triangles on the ceiling. Pænda was joined by three off-stage backing vocalists: Christina Horn, Noy Ben Shabat and Or Ilan.

At the end of the show, Austria was not announced among the top 10 entries in the second semi-final and therefore failed to qualify to compete in the final. It was later revealed that Austria placed seventeenth in the semi-final, receiving a total of 21 points: 0 points from the televoting and 21 points from the juries.

Voting
Voting during the three shows involved each country awarding two sets of points from 1-8, 10 and 12: one from their professional jury and the other from televoting. Each nation's jury consisted of five music industry professionals who are citizens of the country they represent, with their names published before the contest to ensure transparency. This jury judged each entry based on: vocal capacity; the stage performance; the song's composition and originality; and the overall impression by the act. In addition, no member of a national jury was permitted to be related in any way to any of the competing acts in such a way that they cannot vote impartially and independently. The individual rankings of each jury member as well as the nation's televoting results were released shortly after the grand final.

Below is a breakdown of points awarded to Austria and awarded by Austria in the second semi-final and grand final of the contest, and the breakdown of the jury voting and televoting conducted during the two shows:

Points awarded to Austria

Points awarded by Austria

Detailed voting results
The following members comprised the Austrian jury:
 Peter Vieweger (jury chairperson)musician, represented Austria in the 1983 contest as member of Weekend
  (Missy May)singer
 Bettina RuprechterPR consultant, coach
  (Mathea)singer and composer
 Julian Heidrich (Julian Le Play)artist

References 

2019
Countries in the Eurovision Song Contest 2019
Eurovision